Amanda "Mandy" Louise Reid is an Australian taxonomist and malacologist who works as the collection manager of the malacology collection at Australian Museum. She is a published researcher and author. Her research has resulted in the description of many species of velvet worms and cephalopods.

Career 

Reid is an alumna of Macquarie University, a public research university in Sydney, Australia, where she completed a Bachelor of Science degree in 1984. She completed a Master of Science degree in 1990, with a thesis titled Taxonomic review of the Australian Rossiinae (Cephalopoda : Sepiolidae).
She completed a PhD in 1996, with a thesis titled A systematic review of the Peripatopsidae (Onychophora) in Australia.

Reid has an interest in cephalopods, particularly bobtail or bottletail squids (Sepiolidae), cuttlefishes (Sepiidae), and pygmy squids (Idiosepiidae). She has authored two books, and her research has been published in a number of scientific journals, including Invertebrate Taxonomy, Bulletin of Marine Science, Australian Natural History, Zootaxa, and others.

Reid is member of the Australian Marine Sciences Association (AMSA), the Cephalopod International Advisory Council, and Sustainable Population Australia.

Books authored 
 Norman M., Reid A. (2000) A Guide to Squid, Cuttlefish and Octopuses of Australasia (The Gould League of Australia and CSIRO Publishing: Melbourne).
 Reid A. (2016) Cephalopods of Australia and Sub-Antarctic Territories (CSIRO Publishing: Melbourne).

See also 
 List of Macquarie University people
 Partial list of taxa described by Amanda Reid

References 

Australian malacologists
Teuthologists
Australian marine biologists
Living people
Macquarie University alumni
Women marine biologists
Women zoologists
Year of birth missing (living people)